Mahad Mohamed Haji (born 11 April 1996) is a Somali former footballer.

Career statistics

International

References

1996 births
Living people
Association football defenders
Somalian footballers
Somalia international footballers